

Events
February 15–October 30 – The Rui Shi Music Festival is held in Beijing, China.

Albums
Hiroyuki Sawano – V (January)

Classical

Musical films
Almost Pyaar with DJ Mohabbat, with score and songs by Amit Trivedi and lyrics by Shellee. (India - Hindi)

Deaths
January 3 – Joseph Koo ("Moran"), 92, Hong Kong composer
January 4 – Beeyar Prasad, 61, Indian Malayalam lyricist (complications of stroke)
January 11 – Yukihiro Takahashi, 70, Japanese musician best known as a drummer and vocalist
February 16 – Maon Kurosaki, 35, Japanese pop singer
February 4 – Vani Jairam, 77, Indian playback singer
February 23 – Junnosuke Kuroda, 34, Japanese rock musician
March 1 – Neela Ramgopal, 87, Indian Carnatic vocalist and teacher

By country 
 2023 in Chinese music
 2023 in Japanese music
 2023 in Philippine music
 2023 in South Korean music

See also 
 2023 in music

References 

Asia
Asian music
2023 in Asia